Duarte Maria de Ortigão Ramos Félix da Costa (born May 31, 1985 in Cascais) is a Portuguese auto racing driver. He is the older brother of racing driver António Félix da Costa.

Career history

Single-seaters
Félix da Costa began his career in karting, and moved into racing cars in 2004 when he competed in the Formula BMW UK championship, where he raced for two years for Carlin Motorsport, finishing 13th and 10th in the championship standings. He moved to Formula Renault for 2006, competing in the Formula Renault 2.0 Northern European Cup (which his brother Antonio won in 2009) and the Eurocup Formula Renault 2.0.

Touring cars and GT
Having failed to win a race in single-seaters during three years, Félix da Costa moved to the Spanish SEAT León Supercopa in 2007, finishing ninth. He moved to the new SEAT León Eurocup for 2008, where he also finished ninth. His performances at Motorsport Arena Oschersleben were enough to win a guest drive with World Touring Car Championship team SUNRED Engineering for the Race of Italy at Autodromo Nazionale Monza. For 2009 Félix da Costa competed in the Portuguese Touring Car Championship and the International GT Open. He also competed in the European Touring Car Cup at Braga for British Touring Car Championship team Bamboo Engineering, in a Chevrolet Lacetti alongside team regular Harry Vaulkhard.

Complete World Touring Car Championship results
(key) (Races in bold indicate pole position) (Races in italics indicate fastest lap)

References

External links

1985 births
Living people
Sportspeople from Cascais
Portuguese racing drivers
Formula BMW UK drivers
Formula Renault Eurocup drivers
Formula Renault 2.0 NEC drivers
SEAT León Eurocup drivers
World Touring Car Championship drivers
Blancpain Endurance Series drivers
International GT Open drivers
24 Hours of Spa drivers
European Touring Car Cup drivers
Carlin racing drivers
Koiranen GP drivers
Drivex drivers
Zengő Motorsport drivers
Craft-Bamboo Racing drivers